Solana is a blockchain platform that was founded in 2020. The company has been subject to several outages and a class-action lawsuit regarding the sale of unregistered tokens.

History 
Solana's first block was created on 16 March, 2020. In June 2021, Solana sold $314 million worth of shares in its company, in the form of digital tokens rather than the traditional equity shares.

On July 1, 2022, a class action lawsuit was filed against Solana. The lawsuit accused Solana of selling unregistered securities tokens in the form of Solana from March 24, 2020, onward and that Solana deliberately misled investors concerning the total circulating supply of SOL tokens. According to the lawsuit, Anatoly Yakovenko, the founder of Solana Labs, lent a market maker more than 11.3 million tokens in April 2020 and failed to disclose this information to the public. The lawsuit claimed that Solana stated it would reduce the supply by this amount, but it only burned 3.3 million tokens.

On 3 August, 2022, 9,231 Solana wallets were hacked and four Solana wallet addresses stole approximately $8 million from victims. The company stated that the hack was caused by digital wallet software from Slope Finance, a company whose Series A funding was co-led by Solana and Jump Crypto.

In November 2022, the price of Solana dropped by 40 percent in one day following the Bankruptcy of FTX, due to sell off from Alameda Research. Solana was Alameda's second-largest holding at the time and FTX held $982 million in Solana tokens. Also in November 2022, Google announced they would run Solana validators. By the end of 2022, Solana had lost more than $50 billion in value since the beginning of the year.

In February 2023 Def Jam and Universal Music Group signed The Whales, a gamified avatar music group built around Solana NFTs.

Outages 
On 14 September, 2021, the Solana blockchain went offline after a surge of transactions caused the network to fork, and different validators had different views of the state of the network. The network was brought back online the next day on 15 September, 2021.

The Solana blockchain again went offline on 1 May, with the outage lasting roughly seven hours due to it being taken offline by bots. The blockchain went offline again on 31 May, 2022, due to a bug in how the blockchain processes offline transactions. This outage lasted about four and a half hours.

On 1 October, 2022, the Solana network went down for 6 hours due to a consensus bug in the validator client allowing a misconfigured node to publish multiple valid but different blocks.

Solana's outages have frequently resulted in the value of the network's native Sol token falling.

See also 
 List of cryptocurrencies
 Decentralized finance

References

Blockchains
Cross-platform software
Cryptocurrencies
Cryptocurrency projects